Munasipovo (Monasip) is a rural locality (a village) in Semyonovsky Selsoviet, Baymaksky District, Bashkortostan, Russia. The population was 83 as of 2010. There are 2 streets.

Geography 
Munasipovo is located 15 km southeast of Baymak (the district's administrative centre) by road. Semyonovskoye is the nearest rural locality.

References 

Rural localities in Baymaksky District